Hurricane Kate was a long-lived and erratic tropical cyclone that caused minor impacts across the Atlantic Ocean from late September to early October 2003. The sixteenth tropical cyclone, eleventh tropical storm, seventh hurricane, and third major hurricane of the 2003 Atlantic hurricane season, Kate developed from a tropical wave in the central tropical Atlantic on September 25. Its unusual track included four major changes in direction. The storm moved northwestward until a weakness in the subtropical ridge forced it eastward. Kate strengthened to a hurricane, turned sharply westward while moving around a mid-level low, and intensified to a  major hurricane on October 4. Kate turned sharply northward around the periphery of an anticyclone, weakened, and became extratropical after passing to the east of Newfoundland. The extratropical storm persisted for three days until losing its identity near Scandinavia.

The storm had minimal effects on land, limited to moderately strong winds and heavy rainfall over Newfoundland. Kate threatened Atlantic Canada just one week after Hurricane Juan caused severe damage in Nova Scotia.

Meteorological history

On September 21, a tropical wave – a trough of relatively low atmospheric pressure – began moving slowly westward from the west coast of Africa, passing near the Cape Verde islands on September 23. Though the wave was disorganized, a low-level circulation developed on September 24 a few hundred miles to the southwest of Cape Verde. Steady organization ensued, including the development of convection into curved bands around the system.

The depression moved northwestward due to a weakness in the subtropical ridge. Despite early predictions of steady strengthening to reach  within 48 hours, the depression remained weak due to strong south-southwesterly wind shear. The shear remained strong, and though the National Hurricane Center forecast the system to remain a depression through September 30, the depression unexpectedly strengthened to Tropical Storm Kate on September 27, coinciding with an increase in deep convection near the center. Kate turned to the north and northeast, and despite  of shear over the storm Kate continued to strengthen.

Hurricane Kate maintained hurricane status for twelve hours before decelerating to the north and weakening to a tropical storm. The storm then turned sharply west-southwestward while moving around the eastern side of a mid-level circulation. Passing over progressively warmer waters and into an area with decreasing vertical shear, Kate regained hurricane status on October 1. Guided by an anticyclone to its north and a cyclonic circulation to its south, the hurricane continued west-southwestward over the subtropical waters of 30° N, and presented a well-defined eye on October 2.

Shortly after peaking, the western portion of the central dense overcast, or the area of high, thick clouds around the eye, began to deteriorate, and Hurricane Kate started to weaken. On October 5, the storm dropped below major hurricane status. Kate turned sharply northward due to it moving around the western periphery of a powerful anticyclone, and consequently slowed its forward motion. It slowly weakened as it turned to the north-northeast, with an eye occasionally re-appearing on satellite images. On October 7, however, Kate weakened to a tropical storm while moving over cooler waters. The system remained a powerful system, and later on October 8 the extratropical remnant of Kate retained winds of up to  while passing south of Greenland. The storm turned to the east, passed a short distance south of Iceland, and merged with another extratropical storm near Scandinavia on October 10.

Preparations and impact
Such actions include securing loose objects, cleaning debris from storm drains, and owning appropriate hurricane supplies (such as a charged cell phone and batteries in the event of power outages). A cruise ship scheduled to stop in St. John's bypassed Newfoundland to avoid the storm. The Newfoundland and Maritimes Weather Center issued a storm warning for Newfoundland, while the Canadian Hurricane Centre issued a hurricane-force wind warning. Due to the expected combination of moisture from Kate and a cold front, the Canadian Hurricane Centre also issued a heavy rainfall warning for southeastern Newfoundland. Offshore, waves were expected to reach , while marine wind warnings were issued as well.

The interaction between Kate and a high pressure area to its north produced  waves along the coast of North Carolina and New England. St. John's reported  on October 6, a record for the date. Due to dry conditions in the preceding weeks, the ground easily absorbed the water, resulting in a lack of flooding. Overall, there were no reports of damage or deaths associated with Kate.

See also

 Other storms of the same name
Hurricane Maria (2005) - Storm with similar track and intensity

References

External links

 
 Canadian Hurricane Centre Archive for Kate
 National Hurricane Center Advisory Archive for Kate

Kate
Kate (2003)
Kate (2003)
Kate (2003)
Kate